Herbert Emery Schonland (September 7, 1900 – November 13, 1984) was a United States Navy Rear Admiral and a recipient of the United States military's highest decoration—the Medal of Honor—for his actions in World War II.

Biography

Schonland was born in Portland, Maine September 7, 1900 and graduated from the United States Naval Academy in Annapolis, Maryland in 1925. joined the Navy from his birth state of Maine. On that day, the San Francisco was heavily damaged during the Naval Battle of Guadalcanal and began taking on water. Schonland, as the damage control officer, worked through the night to stop the flooding and save the ship.

His actions during this encounter demonstrated his acumen.  The ship had taken 85 hits in excess of five inches just above the water line and was leaking badly.  At a key point during the effort to keep it from sinking, Schonland realized that the pumps for the second deck were inadequate to remove the water, but that the vessel had much higher capacity bilge pumps.  So he called down to the engine room to arrange for all the bilge pumps to be pumping at full capacity, and the crew there ready for an immense amount of water.  He then opened the hatches to the lower decks.  This served the additional purpose of lowering the center of gravity of the ship, thus increasing its stability during the effort to save it.  (John Carlton-Foss reporting a personal communication with Andrew Sims, Schonland's son in law)

He reached the rank of rear admiral before leaving the Navy. Schonland died November 13, 1984 at age 84. He and his wife Claire Mills (1908–1997) are buried in Arlington National Cemetery, Arlington County, Virginia.

Honor and awards

Medal of Honor citation
Schonland's official Medal of Honor citation reads:
For extreme heroism and courage above and beyond the call of duty as damage control officer of the U.S.S. San Francisco in action against greatly superior enemy forces in the battle off Savo Island, 12–13 November 1942. In the same violent night engagement in which all of his superior officers were killed or wounded, Lt. Comdr. Schonland was fighting valiantly to free the San Francisco of large quantities of water flooding the second deck compartments through numerous shell holes caused by enemy fire. Upon being informed that he was commanding officer, he ascertained that the conning of the ship was being efficiently handled, then directed the officer who had taken over that task to continue while he himself resumed the vitally important work of maintaining the stability of the ship. In water waist deep, he carried on his efforts in darkness illuminated only by hand lanterns until water in flooded compartments had been drained or pumped off and watertight integrity had again been restored to the San Francisco. His great personal valor and gallant devotion to duty at great peril to his own life were instrumental in bringing his ship back to port under her own power, saved to fight again in the service of her country.

Other honors
The U.S. Navy Surface Warfare Officer School's Damage Control School in Newport, Rhode Island was named Schonland Hall in his honor.  It is unusual for buildings to be named for someone who is still alive and in this case the event occurred near the end of his lifetime, yet he was alert enough to understand and participate in the process. There was no previous person who had ever been awarded the Medal of Honor for damage control.  (John Carlton-Foss reporting a personal communication with Andrew Sims, Schonland's son in law)

See also

 List of Medal of Honor recipients

References

External links
 
 

1900 births
1984 deaths
United States Navy personnel of World War II
Burials at Arlington National Cemetery
United States Navy Medal of Honor recipients
Military personnel from Portland, Maine
United States Navy admirals
World War II recipients of the Medal of Honor